Lene Moyell Johansen (born 19 December 1968) is a Danish lawyer who has been the High Commissioner of the Faroe Islands since 15 May 2017. She previously served in the government of Roskilde, and has worked in the Faroe Islands since 2008.

References

External links
Information on the High Commissioner from the official Danish Prime Minister's Office website.

1968 births
Living people
20th-century Danish lawyers
Danish women lawyers
High Commissioners of the Faroe Islands
University of Copenhagen alumni
21st-century Danish lawyers